The Dodos were giving this live album away for free during the release of their third album Time to Die, for joining The Dodos website. It consists of 10 tracks taken from their previous album, Visiter.

The album was recorded in Akropolis, Prague.

Track listing
"Walking" - 2:07
"Red and Purple/Eyelids" - 5:01
"Fools" - 5:57
"Joe's Waltz" - 8:19
"Winter" - 4:35
"It's That Time Again" - 1:57
"Paint the Rust" - 6:02
"Jodi" - 6:31
"Ashley" - 4:37
"The Season" - 11:44

2009 live albums
The Dodos albums